Echo Lake Park is a park located along the Mount Evans Scenic Byway about  west of Denver, Colorado.  The park provides a stone shelter with picnic tables and barbecue grills on one end of the lake, and the 1926 Echo Lake Lodge (gift shop and restaurant service only) and an Arapaho National Forest campground are found at the other.  Access to backpacking trails, including the Chicago Lakes trail and Lincoln Lakes trail, can be found adjacent to the lake. The park is part of the Denver Mountain Parks system.

Historic designation
Echo Lake Park was listed on the National Register of Historic Places in 1995. It included the Echo Lake Lodge, built in 1926, which was designed by Denver architect Jacques Benedict, a two-story octagonal log building on a base of local granite that resembles a Native American earth lodge.

Echo Lake, along with Mount Evans, was designated as a historic site by the American Physical Society in 2017, in honor of many cosmic-ray physics experiments conducted at the lake and on the mountain between 1935 and 1960.  The historic plaque is outside the Echo Lake Lodge.

Echo Lake

It formed during the latest period of glaciation roughly 10,000 years ago. As glaciers retreated in the Chicago Creek valley, lateral moraines formed a natural dam to drainage, forming the lake. The ecosystem around the lake is dominated by Engelmann Spruce (Picea engelmannii) and Subalpine Fir (Abies lasiocarpa), with some Limber Pine (Pinus flexilis) on exposed sites.

See also
National Register of Historic Places listings in Clear Creek County, Colorado
Summit Lake Park
List of lakes in Colorado

References

External links

Denver Mountain Parks - Echo Lake

Lakes of Colorado
Denver Mountain Parks
Parks on the National Register of Historic Places in Colorado
Protected areas of Clear Creek County, Colorado
Bodies of water of Clear Creek County, Colorado
National Register of Historic Places in Clear Creek County, Colorado
Protected areas established in 1921
1921 establishments in Colorado